Rede Tupi (in English, Tupi Network) was a Brazilian television network free-to-air. Its parent broadcaster, located in the city of São Paulo, was the first TV station to operate in the country, being inaugurated on 18 September 1950 by journalist Assis Chateaubriand. He belonged to Diários Associados, one of the largest media conglomerates of the 20th century, owner of several newspapers, magazines, and radio. The channel was formed in the 1970s, with members as co-brothers of the Diários Associados and affiliates. The generating stations were TV Tupi São Paulo and TV Tupi Rio de Janeiro. Due to a history of management problems, which resulted in a financial crisis, Tupi had part of its concessions revoked by the Government of Brazil in July 1980, extinguishing the network.

History 
Named after the Tupiniquim tribe in Brazil, Rede Tupi was a pioneer in television programming in South America, setting the tone for the best dramas, news programming, sports, theater, and entertainment in the 1950s and 1960s such as TV de Vanguarda (Vanguard TV), O Repórter Esso (The Esso Reporter), Alô Docura, Clube dos Artistas (1952–80), Beto Rockfeller, O Mundo é das Mulheres (The World is for Women) and many more. It led the way for the establishment of television stations throughout Brazil, and in 1960, beat other stations in broadcasting via satellite (the first Brazilian TV network to achieve such a feat) in honor of the formal opening of Brasilia.

Its success prompted other nations in the continent to have television stations. The network added new talent to Brazilian show business, which was then a thriving industry depending on movies and radio. During the 1960s, its programs revolutionized television through animation, humor, comedy and children's shows plus the telenovelas that gave rise to the 1965 launch of its rival network in Rio de Janeiro, Rede Globo.

Tupi had its own mark in news: Rede Tupi de Noticias (Tupi News Network) became one of its successful broadcasts. The newscast was unique because it was broadcast three times each night. Ana Maria Braga was the main presenter. It had three sections: sports, local news and national/world news.

In 1964, it became Brazil's second television network to experiment with television programmes broadcasting in color following Rede Excelsior in 1962. After its founder's death in 1968, the network, due to a crisis with its owners, transitioned itself becoming the first national television network in 1970, composed of its two main stations, Channels 4 and 6, its 7 other stations and 17 affiliate stations nationwide.

In 1972, Tupi joined other Brazilian stations in the move to full color TV broadcasts. On March 31, that very year Tupi's special program, Mais Cor em Sua Vida (More Color in Your Life) officially kicked off its color transmissions, and debuted a new logo in celebration, replacing the old number 6 logo used in Rio during its monochrome days.

The network started to experience trouble during the 1970s, including being in too much debt, which resulted in a strike by the actors of their telenovelas. Things went from bad to worse after a fire broke out in 1978.

Closure 
Rede Tupi was ordered by the federal government of Brazil (military dictatorship at the time) to cease its operations. This happened from the 16th to the 18th, in July 1980, when its two stations in São Paulo (Tupi Channel 4) and Rio de Janeiro (Tupi Channel 6) shut down, together with its 7 other stations nationwide. The Department of National Telecommunications did not approve the planned extension of Rede Tupi's television concession. Following the closure of Rede Tupi's seven stations the previous day, The Rio station signed off for the last time on midday of the 18th. The final days of broadcasts at the network's Rio de Janeiro studios are the 18-hour long vigil. The network rebroadcast the mass attended by Pope John Paul II (during his visit to Brazil) at Rio de Janeiro. Its sounds was replaced by a male voiceover appealing to president João Figueiredo, accompanied by emotional background music. Then, it switched to the staff of the station who they turned emotional. "Até breve, telespectadores amigos" (See you soon, viewers and friends) and its network's name under the words, was appeared on the screen in capital letters. This was switched to its logo in a black background, with the theme song of American documentary series "Victory at Sea", composed by Richard Rodgers, as its background music, then to static. Various networks in Brazil covered the closure of the station, including Rede Bandeirantes.

Tupi's São Paulo, Porto Alegre and Belém channels became the nuclei of SBT (Brazilian Television System, then TVS, TV Studios Channel 4) of the Grupo Silvio Santos (Silvio Santos Group) of Silvio Santos later in August 1981. Its Rio, Belo Horizonte, Recife and Fortaleza outlets became the nucleus of Rede Manchete (Manchete Network Channel 9), of the Bloch Editores (Bloch Editors) publishing group of Adolpho Bloch, in June 1983.

Slogans 
 1950-1969: A pioneira (The Pioneer)
 1970-1979: Do tamanho do Brasil (As Big as Brazil)
 1972: Sistema Tupicolor, vamos por mais cor na sua vida (The Tupicolor system, Let's Put More Color in Your Life)
 1973-1975: Tupi, uma estação de emoções (Tupi, An Emotional Station)
 1979-1980: Tupi, mais calor humano (Tupi, More Human Warmth)

Idents

Broadcasters

Generating stations

O&Os

Affiliates
 TV Sentinela (Óbidos, PA) - Channel 7 (now a Rede Bandeirantes affiliate)
 TV Iguaçu (Curitiba, PR) - Channel 4 (1978-1980) (now a SBT affiliate)
 TV Cultura (Florianópolis, SC) - Canal 6 (now a Record News affiliate)
 TV Uberaba (Uberaba, MG) - Channel 7 (now TV Bandeirantes Triângulo)
 TV Tibagi (Apucarana, PR) - Channel 11 (now a part of Rede Massa (SBT))
 TV Coroados (Londrina, PR) - Channel 3 (now a part of RPC (Rede Globo))
 TV Rio Preto (São José do Rio Preto, SP) - Channel 8 (Now RecordTV Rio Preto)
 TV Esplanada (Ponta Grossa, PR) - Channel 7 (now a part of RPC (Rede Globo))
 TV Coligadas (Blumenau, SC) - Channel 3 (now a part of NSC TV (Rede Globo))
 TV Altamira (Altamira, PA) - Channel 6 (now a TV Cultura affiliate)
 TV Sergipe (Aracaju, SE) (1971-1975) - Channel 4 (now a Rede Globo affiliate)
 TV Atalaia (Aracaju, SE) (1975-1980) - Channel 8 (now a RecordTV affiliate)

References

Television networks in Brazil
Defunct television networks
Portuguese-language television networks
Television channels and stations established in 1950
Television channels and stations disestablished in 1980
Diários Associados
Articles containing video clips
Defunct television channels in Brazil